"Finally" is a song by American singer-songwriter CeCe Peniston, released in September 1991 as her debut single from her first album, Finally (1992). It received critical acclaim, becoming Peniston's first (and biggest) hit song, peaking at number five on the US Billboard Hot 100 in January 1992. It is also her only US top-ten hit to date. Prior to that, the track was a major success on the Billboard Hot Dance Club Play chart, where it spent two weeks at number one in late 1991. In addition, a dance remix of the song, the "Choice Mix", peaked at number two on the UK Singles Chart in March 1992. The remix appeared on many dance music compilations in the early '90s.

Background and release
Peniston grew up in Phoenix and began writing pop songs during school. The words of "Finally"  were purportedly penned during a chemistry class, while thinking about dating in college. In 1989 and 1990, she won the Miss Black Arizona pageant, and took the Miss Galaxy pageant a short time later.

Her music career began in January 1991, when Felipe "DJ Wax Dawg" Delgado, her friend and a record producer based also in Phoenix, asked Peniston to record back-up vocals for Tonya Davis, a rapper known as Overweight Pooch. Though Overweight Pooch's album flopped on the market, Manny Lehman (a DJ and executive producer) had noticed the powerful voice of the back-up vocalist, Peniston. He offered Delgado a chance to produce a track for Peniston to cultivate her potential as a solo artist. Delgado called hometown friend and music producer, Rodney K. Jackson, to help co-produce Peniston's single, which would become "Finally".

Peniston was 21 years old when "Finally" was released. When asked about the song in a 2012 interview, Peniston said, 

New versions of "Finally" were released in 1997 and 2011.

Composition
The remix of this song is based on the piano riff from the house music classic "Someday" by CeCe Rogers from 1987. The song is performed in the key of B minor with a tempo of 120 beats per minute, following a chord progression of G – G/A – Bm, and Peniston's vocals span from B3 to D5. In 2017, Peniston told about recording the song,

Chart performance
The song was released in the fall of 1991, where it became an instant dance anthem, peaking in October at the top of the Billboard Hot Dance Music/Club Play chart in the United States for two weeks, while achieving respectable chart success overseas the following year. The song was re-released in the United Kingdom, where it reached a new peak of number two in its second week at the UK Singles Chart, on March 22, 1992. It was held off reaching the top spot by Shakespears Sister's "Stay". "Finally" also charted at number-one in Zimbabwe and on the RPM Dance/Urban chart in Canada, and number eight in Australia and New Zealand. In Europe, the song reached number three in Belgium and number five in the Netherlands and Ireland. Following the single's success, Peniston completed her first album, Finally, in two months. The album was critically acclaimed, and Peniston celebrated a year-long run of awards success including the Billboard Award for Best New Artist (dance), and three ASCAP awards amongst numerous others. The song "Finally" has sold over 3 million copies to date.

Critical reception
J.D. Considine from The Baltimore Sun felt the song "is a delightful surprise, marrying a muscular, insinuating groove to Peniston's soulful, insistent vocals." Larry Flick from Billboard complimented it as "a delicious peak-hour houser that is in a vein similar to Alison Limerick's "Where Love Lives". Peniston wraps her lovely alto around a hook that seeps into the brain and body and never lets go." He also remarked that Peniston "proves her potential as a future diva on this brain-embedding, spine-stirring house anthem." Amy Linden from Entertainment Weekly commented, "The slammin’ house/pop single of the moment? It's CeCe Peniston's "Finally," and its sheer joy and verve." She explained further, "Grooving in the fabulousness of her newfound Mr. Right, and sorta amazed that it all happened, she wails deliciously, making you believe that true love will conquer all and that someday your prince (or princess) will come." Dave Sholin from the Gavin Report described it as a "bright and infectious" debut release and concluded, "I had a preview of this song back in July and have been in love with it ever since!" Dennis Hunt from Los Angeles Times viewed it as "lively".

Pan-European magazine Music & Media stated that "this newcomer gives further evidence that dance is still developing into a more song-oriented direction. The violins give the tune the ambiance of "Backstabbers" by the O'Jays." Andy Beevers from Music Week complimented it as an "extremely classy and catchy garage-styled debut". A reviewer from People Magazine felt that it's "overflowing with verve and loaded up with joyous girlie glee", noting the "ecstatic, beat-heavy power" of the track. James Hamilton from the RM Dance Update labeled it as "cheerful wailing" and a "ex-Miss America's catchy Crystal Waters-type US pop smash". Adam Higginbotham from Select declared "Finally" as "a superb slice of feel-good pop music. From its bassline – purloined from Ce Ce (no relation) Rogers' classic garage tune 'Someday' — to the inanely cheery lyrics." Tom Doyle from Smash Hits viewed it as a "rousing house song". Steve Pick from St. Louis Post-Dispatch wrote that "this is a catchy disco number, building energy through repetition of the simple hookline and a solid bass/drum throb. Get on the dance floor to this one, and you'll move."

Retrospective response
Bill Lamb from About.com featured "Finally" in their list of "The Top 100 Best Party Songs", describing it as an "upbeat, celebratory song about love". Steven E. Flemming, Jr. from Albumism noted that it "skillfully melded the insistent grace of all that’s right about dance production values with grand vocals." AllMusic editor Craig Lytle felt that the song and its follow-up, "We Got a Love Thang", "employ that rapid dancehall groove better known as house music". Stopera and Galindo from BuzzFeed remarked, "When it comes to ‘90s dance songs you’d be hard-pressed to find another song that so perfectly incorporates other music genres that made the decade so great — i.e., R&B, house, and pop — which is what makes “Finally" the quintessential ‘90s dance song. And honestly, it's a feel-good hit! Just try being in a bad mood after listening to it!" A writer from Complex said that "this was the sound of the early 1990s, when everything was turning colorful and bright." Pop Rescue called it "a great track, with that fantastic hand-clap, bassline and piano opening", adding that Peniston's vocals are "sublime".

Music video
A music video was made for "Finally", directed by Claude Borenzweig. It is very simple, showing Peniston performing the song within a variety of shapes and colors, sometimes with a guy dancing. The video was later published by Vevo on YouTube in June 2009, remastered in HD, and had generated more than 40 million views as of January 2023.

Impact and legacy
DJ Magazine ranked "Finally" number 64 in their list of "Top 100 Club Tunes" in 1998.
VH1 ranked it number 29 in their list of the "100 Greatest Dance Songs" in 2000. 
MTV Dance ranked the song number 28 in their list of "The 100 Biggest '90s Dance Anthems of All Time" in November 2011. Heart TV ranked "Finally" number three in their list of "55 Biggest '90s Club Classics" in March 2017. BuzzFeed ranked the song number one in "The 101 Greatest Dance Songs of the '90s" in 2017, writing, "When it comes to ‘90s dance songs you’d be hard-pressed to find another song that so perfectly incorporates other music genres that made the decade so great — i.e., R&B, house, and pop — which is what makes “Finally" the quintessential ‘90s dance song." Slant Magazine ranked it number 37 in their list of "The 100 Best Dance Songs of All Time" in 2020. The Guardian ranked it number 66 in their "The 70 Greatest No 2 Singles – Ranked!" in 2022. Alexis Petridis wrote, "House music as pure pop-soul, "Finally" was a hymn to an idealised boyfriend sung by a former Miss Black Arizona." Same year, Pitchfork ranked it number 87 in their countdown of "The 250 Best Songs of the 1990s" in 2022.

Accolades

Music awards and nominations

ASCAP Awards

Billboard Music Video AwardsBMI AwardsVH1 AwardsWinter Music Conference AwardsTrack listings and formats

 US cassette single "Finally" (7" Mix) – 4:27
 "Finally" (7" Choice Mix) – 4:08

 US CD single "Finally" (7" Choice Mix) – 4:08
 "Finally" (12" Mix without Rap) – 7:07
 "Finally" (12" Choice Mix) – 7:04

 US 12" and CD maxi-single "Finally" (12" Mix) – 7:04
 "Finally" (Momo Mix) – 7:02
 "Finally" (7" Mix) – 4:27
 "Finally" (12" Choice Mix) – 7:04
 "Finally" (Journey Mix) – 7:02
 "Finally" (7" Choice Mix) – 4:08

 European and UK 7", CD and cassette French singles "Finally" (7" Choice Mix) – 4:08
 "Finally" (7" Mix without Rap) – 4:05

 Australian CD and cassette single "Finally" (7" Choice Mix) – 4:08
 "Finally" (12" Choice Mix) – 7:04

 Netherlands and UK 7" singles "Finally" (7" Choice Mix) – 4:08
 "Finally" (7" PKA Mix) – 3:58

 Australian, European and UK 12" singles "Finally" (12" Choice Mix) – 7:04
 "Finally" (7" Choice Mix) – 4:08
 "Finally" (Somedub Mix) – 7:07

 UK 12" single "Finally" (12" Choice Mix) – 7:04
 "Finally" (12" PKA Mix) – 7:08
 "We Got a Love Thang" (The Factory Jam) – 7:08

 UK CD single "Finally" (7" Choice Mix) – 4:08
 "Finally" (12" Choice Mix) – 7:04
 "Finally" (Somedub Mix) – 7:07

 European and UK CD maxi-single "Finally" (7" Choice Mix) – 4:08
 "Finally" (12" Choice Mix) – 7:04
 "Finally" (Somedub Mix) – 7:07
 "Finally" (7" Mix without Rap) – 4:05

 UK CD maxi-single "Finally" (7" Choice Mix) – 4:08
 "Finally" (12" Choice Mix) – 7:04
 "Finally" (12" PKA Mix) – 7:08
 "Finally" (7" PKA Mix) – 3:58
 "Finally" (Somedub Mix) – 7:07

Credits and personnelManagement Executive producers – Manny Lehman, Mark Mazzetti
 Recording studio – Aztec Studios, Phoenix, Arizona
 Publishing – Wax Museum Music, Mainlot Music (BMI), Polygram MusicProduction Writers – Cecilia Peniston (lyrics), Felipe Delgado, Rodney K. Jackson, and Elbert Lee Linnear (music)
 Producers – Delgado, Rodney Jackson  (co-producer); David Morales and Philip Kelsey (remix)
 Remixing – Morales, Kelsey
 Engineering – David Sussman; Kelsey (remix)Personnel Vocals – Peniston
 Percussion – Morales
 Piano – Eric Kupper (acoustic and solo)
 Keyboards – Rodney K. Jackson
 Programming – Delgado
 Cover art – Simon Fowler, Peggy Sirota
 Design – Sarah Southin, Len Peltier

Charts

Weekly charts

Year-end charts

Decade-end charts

Certifications

Release history

Reissues
"Finally '97"

In 1997, "Finally" was remixed by Eric Kupper to enhance the overseas issue of Peniston's album Finally, which was re-released in Europe and Japan along with her greatest collection, The Best Of CeCe Peniston .

The new remixed version of the song titled "Classic Funk Mix" (a.k.a. "Finally '97") successfully re-entered the British charts, peaking on September 13 at number 26 on the UK Singles Chart, meaning Peniston had three chart entries with one and the same title (in March 92, in September 97).

Additional credits
 Recording studio – Hysteria Recording
 Publishing – PolyGram Music
 Producer, engineering, programming, keyboards, guitar and bass – Eric Kupper
 Remixing – Kupper, George Mitchell and Steven Doherty 
 Design – Alex

Track listings and formats

 French CD single "Finally" (Classic Funk Radio Mix) – 3:26
 "Finally" (Classic Funk Mix) – 7:13

 European CD maxi-single "Finally" (Classic Funk Radio Mix) – 3:26
 "Finally" (Classic Funk Mix) – 7:13
 "Finally" (Nasty Funk Mix)" – 8:00
 "Finally" (Nasty Funk Dub)" – 5:28

 Italian 12-inch vinyl single "Finally" (Nasty Funk Mix)" – 8:00
 "Finally" (Nasty Funk Dub)" – 5:28
 "Finally" (Classic Funk Mix) – 7:13
 "Finally" (Classic Funk Radio Mix) – 3:26

 European/UK CD maxi-single (#1) "Finally" (Classic Funk Radio Mix) – 3:26
 "Finally" (Choice' Mix) – 4:09
 "We Got a Love Thang" (Silky 7") – 4:28
 "Hit by Love" (LP Version) – 4:34

 European/UK CD maxi-single (#2) "Finally" (Classic Funk Radio Mix) – 3:26
 "Finally" (Classic Funk Mix) – 7:13
 "Finally" (Nasty Funk Mix)" – 8:00
 "Finally" (Nasty Funk Dub)" – 5:28
 "Finally" (Sharp's System Vocal) – 8:16
 "Finally" (Sharp's Funky Mirror Ball Dub) – 6:00

 UK 12-inch double vinyl "Finally" (Nasty Funk Mix)" – 8:00
 "Finally" (Sharp's System Vocal) – 8:16
 "Finally" (Acappella)
 "Finally" (Nasty Funk Dub)" – 5:28
 "Finally" (Sharp's Funky Mirror Ball Dub) – 6:00
 "Finally" (Classic Funk Mix) – 7:13
 "Finally" (12" Choice Mix) – 7:05

Charts

Finally 2008

In the summer of 2008, the song was remixed by Kam Denny, an Australian DJ and producer, and Paul Zala, an electrohouse DJ based in Melbourne. Subtitled as "Kam Denny & Paul Zala Remix", or rather "Vandalism Remix", the promotional single was released in Australia on Bimbo Rock, a local indie dance/electro label formed by TV Rock. The new adaptation gained underground house music popularity and entered the local Club Tracks Chart, topping for four weeks at number one.

Additional credits
 Producers and remixing – Kam Denny and Paul Zala

ChartsWeekly chartsYear-end chartsFinally 2011

On the twentieth anniversary of "Finally," Peniston made a number of additional remixes of the song for Paul Oakenfold, featuring Joyriders, and supported also by music video. Originally, the song was to be attached to her cancelled studio album CeCe.

Additional credits
 Executive producer – Paul Oakenfold
 Vocals – Peniston (re-recorded)
 Performer – Joyriders
 Producers and remixing – Roman Hunter, Digitalchord, Zen Freeman, Remy Le Duc, Mikael Nordgren , Chuckii Booker 
 Vocal production – Kevin Lewis

Track listings and formatsRelease #1 "Finally" (Roman Hunter Airplay Mix) – 2:58Release #2 "Finally" (Roman Hunter Remix) – 7:03
 "Finally" (Digitalchord Remix) – 7:00
 "Finally" (Zen Freeman & Remy Le Duc Remix) – 6:03
 "Finally" (Tiger Stripes Remix) – 7:22
 "Finally" (DJ Cii Remix) – 2:31Deep House Selection, Volume 6 (The Finest Deep House Tunes)
 "Finally" (Tiger Stripes Radio Edit) – 3:15

In popular culture
The song features in the 1998 film Bimboland produced by Ariel Zeitoun. The 7-inch Choice Mix was used in the 1994 film The Adventures of Priscilla, Queen of the Desert and featured on its soundtrack album. The song is also featured in the stage musical based on the film.

For her ninth tour Showgirl: The Homecoming Tour that resumed on November 11, 2006, at Sydney Entertainment Centre (ended on January 23, 2007), Kylie Minogue used elements of Peniston's song when performing her 2000 comeback single "Spinning Around", co-written by Paula Abdul.

In November 2009, pop musician Lady Gaga used excerpts of "Finally" for the opening of The Monster Ball Tour in her song "Dance in the Dark".

In July 2014, British singer Matt Fishel included a cover version of the song on his virtual EP Cover Boy. The accompanying video won the category for Best Lyric Video at the 2014 LGBT-based RightOutTV Music & Video Award.

In 2015, the song was also used in an advertisement for Ariel detergent in the Philippines, along with modified lyrics to promote the product. The commercial has since spawned numerous parodies poking fun at the campy nature of the commercial and the song used, with numerous people and fictional characters lip-syncing to the tune.

The song was used as a lip-sync song during the ninth season of RuPaul's Drag Race. On the seventh episode contestants Nina Bo'nina Brown and Aja had to lip-sync to avoid elimination; Aja was eliminated.

The song was also briefly featured in Season 2 Episode 9 of Dear White People.

In 2021, a remixed version used for a commercial for the dating app Bumble. American supermarket chain Kroger, along with its subsidiary supermarket names, uses the song for its animated commercials, promoting grocery delivery at home.

See also
 The Best Dance Album in the World... Ever!
 List of number-one dance singles of 1991 (U.S.)
 List of top 10 singles in 1992 (UK)
 List of Dance Dance Revolution songs
 List of songs that made the biggest jump in the top 50 on the ARIA Singles Chart

References

General

Specific

External links
 

1991 songs
1991 debut singles
1992 singles
1997 singles
2008 singles
2011 singles
CeCe Peniston songs
Number-one singles in Zimbabwe
Songs written by CeCe Peniston
A&M Records singles
Perfecto Records singles
Polydor Records singles
Songs written by Felipe Delgado (record producer)
Music videos directed by Claude Borenzweig